Hans-Christian Siebke (13 July 1940 – 15 February 2023) was a German farmer and politician. A member of the Christian Democratic Union, he served in the Landtag of Schleswig-Holstein from 1996 to 2000.

Siebke died on 15 February 2023, at the age of 82.

References

1940 births
2023 deaths
Christian Democratic Union of Germany politicians
Members of the Landtag of Schleswig-Holstein
People from Neumünster